New Barauni Junction railway station (station code NBJU), is a railway station in the Sonpur division of East Central Railway. New Barauni Junction is located in Barauni city in Begusarai district in the Indian state of Bihar.

Platforms and facilities

New Barauni Junction has two platforms reached with foot overbridges. A second foot overbridge will be built at this station.
The major facilities available are waiting rooms, toilets, tea stall, fruit stall, meal stall etc. Vehicles are allowed to enter the station premises.

See also
Barauni Junction railway station

References

Railway stations in Begusarai district
Railway junction stations in Bihar
Sonpur railway division